This article describes the knockout stage of the 2015–16 Women's EHF Champions League.

Qualified teams
The top four placed teams from each of the two main round groups advanced to the knockout stage.

Format
The first-placed team of each group faced the fourth-placed team, and the second-placed team played against the third-placed team from the other group. After that a draw was held to determine the pairings for the final four.

Quarterfinals

|}

Matches

CSM București won 55–53 on aggregate.
 

Budućnost won 61–49 on aggregate.

Győri ETO won 71–41 on aggregate.

Vardar won 60–48 on aggregate.

Final four

The final four was held at the László Papp Budapest Sports Arena in Budapest, Hungary on 7 and 8 May 2016. The draw was held on 15 April 2016 at 11:30.

Bracket

Semifinals

Third place game

Final

References

External links
Final four website

knockout stage